It May Be Love But It Doesn't Show is a 2011 Italian comedy film written, directed and starred by the comedy duo Ficarra e Picone. It is their first film in which the setting is not Sicilian.

The film was a box office success, grossing over 6 million euros.

Plot summary 
Salvo and Valentino are two Sicilian friends who have moved to Turin, and now run a small business together. They drive foreign tourists around in a double-decker bus, and Salvo always tries to approach the pretty girls. On the other hand, Valentino is a faithful boyfriend but continually pesters his girl Gisella with over-the-top sentimental gestures and gifts. Finally, Gisella becomes totally annoyed and decides to leave him. Since she lacks the courage to tell Valentino herself, she asks Salvo to tell Valentino before she comes back from a work trip.

Salvo, having discovered that his latest tour guide Natasha loves all things African, starts sporting African paraphernalia to impress her. His hopes are buoyed when Natasha tells him that she hasn't heard from her wonderful boyfriend Arturo.

In the meantime, their old friend Sonia arrives in Turin with her American boyfriend Peter. Sonia confides to Valentino that she's about to break up with Peter and has realized that she loves Salvo. Things start to get complicated when Valentino and Natasha turn to each other for comfort from their respective breakups. Gisella observes them dancing up a storm, feels jealous, and starts to regret having broken up with Valentino.

Things come to a head at the wedding of Orazio, another member of the curling team Salvo and Valentino belong to. Misunderstandings abound, stoked by rapidly escalating gossip about Gisella and Salvo. Natasha shows up and discovers "Arturo" is the groom Orazio, and she and the bride thrash him together. In the middle of the tumult, Valentino and Gisella get back together and Salvo and Sonia find love.

Cast 

Salvatore Ficarra as Salvo
Valentino Picone as Valentino
Ambra Angiolini as Gisella
Diane Fleri as Sonia
Sascha Zacharias as Natasha
David Furr as Peter
Giovanni Esposito as  Orazio/Arturo
Sal Borgese as  Orazio's Father
Rossella Leone as Angela
Antonio Rucco as  Angela's Father
Clelia Piscitello as  Angela's Mother
Thierno Thiam as the Tattooist

See also 
 List of Italian films of 2011

References

External links

2011 films
2010s buddy comedy films
Films set in Turin
Italian buddy comedy films
2010s Italian-language films
Films directed by Ficarra e Picone
2010s Italian films